IMCS can refer to any of the following:

Pax Romana, also known as the International Movement of Catholic Students (IMCS).
The Institute for Media Management and Communication Studies, a reputed media institute in New Delhi is a study centre of the Makhanlal Chaturvedi National University of Journalism
The Institute of Marine and Coastal Sciences, an oceanographic institute located at Rutgers University in New Jersey
International Mornington Crescent Society, the rulemaking body of Mornington Crescent, a game
The International Membrane Computing Society, the organization whose objective is to promote the development of membrane computing.